The Santa Cruz Warriors are an American professional basketball team in the NBA G League based in Santa Cruz, California, and are affiliated with the Golden State Warriors. The Warriors play their home games at Kaiser Permanente Arena. Prior to the move to Santa Cruz for the 2012–13 season, the team was known as the Dakota Wizards. In 2014–15, the Warriors won their first D-League championship.

History

Dakota Wizards 

The Warriors began play in 1995 in the International Basketball Association (IBA), and in 2001, with Dave Joerger at the helm, they won the IBA championship in the league's final year of operation.

Following the 2000–01 season, the IBA merged with several teams from the Continental Basketball Association (CBA), and in their first year in the new CBA, Joerger and the Wizards won the league title, defeating the Rockford Lightning. After making it to the semifinals in the 2002–03 season, the Wizards again won the league title in 2004 over the Idaho Stampede, giving Joerger his third title as the Wizards' head coach.

Joerger left the Wizards following the 2003–04 season, and after his departure, the Wizards made it to the semifinals in 2004–05 then missed the playoffs the following season.

Prior to the 2006–07 season, the Wizards joined the NBA Development League, and Joerger returned to Dakota as head coach. He won his fourth title with the Wizards in their first year in the D-League. In the Championship Game, forward Darius Rice came off the Wizards bench to put together a record-setting night that led the Wizards to a 129–121 overtime victory over the Colorado 14ers. Rice scored 52 points and made 11 three-pointers, including one with 4.5 seconds left in regulation to send the game into overtime tied at 109. Rice's points and three-point field goal totals set D-League championship game records.

Between 2007–08 and 2009–10, the Wizards made the playoffs every season but were unable to return to the Finals. This was followed by a 2010–11 season that saw the Wizards miss postseason action for the first time since 2006.

On June 28, 2011, the Golden State Warriors, led by Co-Executive Chairmen Joe Lacob and Peter Guber, purchased the Wizards franchise from Bismarck Professional Basketball LLC. The Warriors became the fourth NBA team to own and operate their own NBA D-League affiliate, joining San Antonio, Oklahoma City and the Los Angeles Lakers.

The Wizards remained in Bismarck during the 2011–12 season, but the Warriors were open to relocating the team to Northern California in 2012. To reflect the new ownership, the Wizards debuted with a new color scheme, the Warriors' blue and gold, used as an alternative to the purple and green, which dates back to their IBA days. The old color scheme was still used with the team's road uniforms, while the blue and gold was used with the home uniforms and the logo. The Wizards were led by Edwin Ubiles in 2011–12, as he helped the team return to the playoffs with a 29–21 record. However, they were unable to move on past the first round following a 2–0 defeat at the hands of the Bakersfield Jam.

Santa Cruz Warriors 
Following intense off-season discussions regarding a move, on October 10, 2012, the Golden State Warriors announced that the Dakota Wizards would relocate to Santa Cruz beginning with the 2012–13 season. The team was subsequently renamed the Santa Cruz Warriors.

In the 2012 NBA Development League Draft, the Warriors selected Travis Leslie with their first pick (13th overall), as Leslie became a star for the team during the 2012–13 season. On December 23, 2012, the Warriors played their first home game at the Kaiser Permanente Arena after beginning their campaign with seven-straight road games. With Leslie leading the way alongside teammates Jeremy Tyler and Maurice Baker, the Warriors made it through to the D-League Finals in their first season. However, they were defeated 2–0 by the Rio Grande Valley Vipers in the best-of-three series. Highlights from the team include Golden State assignees Kent Bazemore and Scott Machado, former NBA player Hilton Armstrong, Most Improved Player recipient Cameron Jones, and Stefhon Hannah, who won Defensive Player of the Year for the second year in a row.

Santa Cruz embraced the team during their first season in the city, as the Warriors placed first in the NBA Development League for overall revenue. The team sold $1.2 million in tickets. The average ticket revenue per game, at $52,651, was the highest in the 16-team league. But while the Warriors' ticket prices were the highest in the league – from $15 for bleachers to $140 for courtside seats – popularity was also key to the financial success. The team had the highest average number of individual tickets sold per game at 709, approximately 130 tickets more than its nearest competitor, the Maine Red Claws.

In 2013–14, the Warriors again finished second in the Western Conference – behind the Los Angeles D-Fenders – and despite only the sixth best record in the D-League standings, the Warriors again reached the Finals. However, they were once again outclassed in the best-of-three Finals series, this time losing 2–0 to the Fort Wayne Mad Ants. Highlights from the team include the Santa Cruz Warriors' D-League Splash Brothers, with Seth Curry and Mychel Thompson emulating their respective brothers playing for Golden State, Stephen Curry and Klay Thompson.

In 2014–15, the Warriors finished with a 35–15 record, good for the best record in the Western Conference. They once again made it through to the Finals and swept the Fort Wayne Mad Ants to claim their first D-League championship since 2007, with Finals MVP Elliot Williams leading the way with a game-high 23 points in Game 2.

On October 24th, 2022, Golden State Warriors rookie draft picks, Patrick Baldwin Jr. and Ryan Rollins were assigned to the Santa Cruz Warriors to continue their development.

Season by season

Current roster

Notable players
Seth Curry (born 1990) basketball player in the NBA for the Brooklyn Nets
Alex Hamilton (born 1993), basketball player for Hapoel Eilat in the Israeli Basketball Premier League
Sean Kilpatrick (born 1990), basketball player for Hapoel Jerusalem of the Israeli Basketball Super League
 Scott Machado (born 1990), basketball player in the Israeli Basketball Premier League
Kaleb Wesson (born 1999), basketball player for Maccabi Rishon LeZion of the Israeli Basketball Premier League

Head coaches

NBA affiliates

Dakota Wizards
Chicago Bulls (2006–2007)
Washington Wizards (2006–2011)
Memphis Grizzlies (2007–2011)
Golden State Warriors (2011–2012)

Santa Cruz Warriors
Golden State Warriors (2012–present)

References

External links

 

 
Basketball teams established in 2012
2012 establishments in California
Basketball teams in California
Sports in Santa Cruz County, California